The Albert Fisher Mansion and Carriage House, at 1206 West 200 South in Salt Lake City, Utah, United States, was designed by architect Richard K.A. Kletting and was built in 1893.  It was listed on the National Register of Historic Places in 2008.

In 2006, the Salt Lake City government purchased the house, which was originally the home of a prominent German brewer.  Restoration costs were estimated at over $1.7 million, so the city began raising money by arranging tours of the property, and $150,000 was obtained through a federal grant.

As a consequence of the Salt Lake City 5.7 magnitude earthquake on March 18, 2020, the mansion was damaged, leading to a closure of the building to the public, boarding up of all the windows and the removal all three damaged chimneys down to the roofline.

In September  2020, a plan was approved to renovate the Fisher Carriage House by local preservation firm CRSA, which included fixing damage it sustained by the earthquake and adapting the carriage house into a river engagement center for the Jordan River 
In March 2022, in what is believed to be the middle of the night, someone stole the fence which surrounded the mansion. The history of the fence isn't as clear as the mansion, which was constructed by Richard K.A. Kletting in 1893. Kletting was the architect behind many distinguished Utah buildings, the Utah State Capitol among them.

It's not known if the fence was original to the mansion or if it was added at a later time, but it has been attached to the mansion property in its earliest years, meaning it's possible that Kletting designed the fence during the construction of the mansion.

There's a good possibility that it's a unique, custom fence. People with the means of Albert Fisher ... they could hire an architect to design a unique one-of-a-kind piece or they could have used catalogs. It was a very industrial time in the late 19th-turn of the 20th century when the house was built — so it's very possible it could have been ordered from a supplier in San Francisco or perhaps the East Coast.

Either way, the designer produced a high-quality fence meant to stand the test of time. While the building has shown signs of wear and tear throughout the years, the fence was as sturdy as ever, though it has since oxidized to black as brass does with time.

References

External links

 

Houses completed in 1893
Houses in Salt Lake City
Houses on the National Register of Historic Places in Utah
Victorian architecture in Utah
Historic American Buildings Survey in Utah
1893 establishments in Utah Territory
National Register of Historic Places in Salt Lake City